Acanthocleithron chapini is the only species of catfish (order Siluriformes) in the genus Acanthocleithron of the family Mochokidae. This species is endemic to the Democratic Republic of the Congo where it occurs in the Ituri River and Congo River from Kisangani to Stanley Pool. This oviparous fish reaches a length of  SL.

References

External links
 Acanthocleithron chapini at DigiMorph: 3D visualizations of the head

Mochokidae

Catfish of Africa
Fish described in 1917
Endemic fauna of the Democratic Republic of the Congo
Fish of the Democratic Republic of the Congo
Taxa named by Ludlow Griscom